The Jena Microbial Resource Collection (JMRC) is a joint collection of the Leibniz Institute for Natural Product Research and Infection Biology – Hans-Knöll-Institute and the University of Jena. It was founded in October 2010 by merging two earlier collections from the two above-mentioned institutes. It is a research institution, which is not normally open to the public. With about 15,000 fungal and about 35,000 bacterial living isolates, it is the largest collection of this kind in Germany. The microorganisms are maintained as active cultures, with some of them in cryopreservation.

Aim of the collection 
The collection is aimed at the conservation of microbial resources for natural product screening. It is also aimed at research on pathogenicity mechanisms of fungal causative agents of a variety of mycoses in animals and humans.

The head of the JMRC is Dr. Kerstin Voigt.

Examples of microbial species in the collection 

 Lichtheimia corymbifera, an ancient human pathogenic basal lineage fungus causing mucormycoses
 Conidiobolus coronatus, an ancient human pathogenic basal lineage fungus causing entomophthoramycoses
 Parasitic Mucorales such as Parasitella parasitica and their host organisms such as Absidia glauca (also belonging to Mucorales)
 Molds leading to food spoilage
 Plant pathogens such as Gilbertella persicaria
 Various Streptomyces
 Pseudomonas aeruginosa, a pathogenic bacterium
 Various Enterobacteriaceae

External links 
 Web page of JMRC at Hans Knöll Institute, Jena
 Central web page of JMRC at the University of Jena 
 Web page of JMRC at the Institute for Microbiology, University of Jena 

University of Jena